Palcasa Airport  is an airport serving the town of El Castillo in Río San Juan Department, Nicaragua. It is surrounded by and supports the palm oil plantations of Palmares del Castillo S.A. (PALCASA).

See also

 List of airports in Nicaragua
 Transport in Nicaragua

References

External links
 HERE Maps - Palcasa

Airports in Nicaragua